The Robert Smalls School is a historic school building at 316 Front Street in Cheraw, South Carolina. This single story brick Colonial Revival structure was designed by the Florence firm of Hopkins, Baker & Gill, and completed in 1953. It was part of a development effort by the city to modernize its schools while continuing to provide "separate but equal" education facilities for its African-American citizenry. It served as a public school until the 1990s, and was sold by the city to a nonprofit organization in 2012. It now houses a food pantry and services for at-risk youth. It was named for Robert Smalls.

It was listed on the National Register of Historic Places in 2014.

See also
National Register of Historic Places listings in Chesterfield County, South Carolina

References

School buildings on the National Register of Historic Places in South Carolina
Public elementary schools in South Carolina
National Register of Historic Places in Chesterfield County, South Carolina
School buildings completed in 1953